William Dillon was an American songwriter.

William Dillon may also refer to:

William Henry Dillon, British naval officer
William G. Dillon, discovered planet
Sir William Dillon, 4th Baronet (1774–1851) of the Dillon baronets

See also
Bill Dillon (disambiguation)

Dillon (surname)